Vindobonella is a genus of proturans in the family Acerentomidae.

Species
 Vindobonella leopoldina Szeptycki & Christian, 2001

References

Protura